The Westland Yeovil was a British biplane bomber designed and built by Westland Aircraft in 1923 to meet an Air Ministry Specification for a single-engined day bomber.

Development
The Yeovil was designed to meet Air Ministry Specification 26/23 for a single-engined day bomber, with a Rolls-Royce Condor engine specified by the ministry. It was a two-bay staggered biplane of composite wood and metal construction. It had a crew of two with the pilot in a cockpit at the front with the bomb aimer/gunner behind. It was powered by a nose-mounted tractor  Rolls-Royce Condor IIIA piston engine, fitted with a Leitner-Watts metal propeller.

Three prototypes were ordered, the first prototype J7508 made its first flight in 1925 from RAF Andover, with Captain Frank Courtney as the test pilot. The prototype was delivered to RAF Martlesham Heath for evaluation against the other aircraft built to meet the specification, the Hawker Horsley and the Bristol Berkeley. After evaluation the Yeovil and Berkley were not ordered into production, the Horsley had already been given a contract against a different specification. The three Yeovil prototypes continued to fly for a few years for research and testing.

Specifications

See also

References

Yeovil
1920s British bomber aircraft
Biplanes
Single-engined tractor aircraft